Elections to Newry and Mourne District Council were held on 7 June 2001 on the same day as the other Northern Irish local government elections. The election used five district electoral areas to elect a total of 30 councillors.

Election results

Note: "Votes" are the first preference votes.

Districts summary

|- class="unsortable" align="centre"
!rowspan=2 align="left"|Ward
! % 
!Cllrs
! % 
!Cllrs
! %
!Cllrs
! %
!Cllrs
! % 
!Cllrs
!rowspan=2|TotalCllrs
|- class="unsortable" align="center"
!colspan=2 bgcolor="" | Sinn Féin
!colspan=2 bgcolor="" | SDLP
!colspan=2 bgcolor="" | UUP
!colspan=2 bgcolor="" | DUP
!colspan=2 bgcolor="white"| Others
|-
|align="left"|Crotlieve
|26.4
|2
|bgcolor="#99FF66"|51.0
|bgcolor="#99FF66"|4
|6.2
|0
|2.4
|0
|14.0
|1
|7
|-
|align="left"|Newry Town
|bgcolor="#008800"|45.5
|bgcolor="#008800"|3
|33.7
|3
|7.6
|0
|0.0
|0
|13.2
|1
|7
|-
|align="left"|Slieve Gullion
|bgcolor="#008800"|68.1
|bgcolor="#008800"|4
|31.9
|1
|0.0
|0
|0.0
|0
|0.0
|0
|5
|-
|align="left"|The Fews
|bgcolor="#008800"|41.6
|bgcolor="#008800"|3
|28.6
|1
|22.0
|2
|7.8
|0
|0.0
|0
|6
|-
|align="left"|The Mournes
|16.8
|1
|27.1
|1
|bgcolor="40BFF5"|30.7
|bgcolor="40BFF5"|2
|25.4
|1
|0.0
|0
|5
|- class="unsortable" class="sortbottom" style="background:#C9C9C9"
|align="left"| Total
|39.2
|13
|35.5
|10
|12.6
|4
|6.4
|1
|6.3
|2
|30
|-
|}

District results

Crotlieve

1997: 4 x SDLP, 2 x Independent Nationalist, 1 x Sinn Féin
2001: 4 x SDLP, 2 x Sinn Féin, 1 x Independent
1997-2001 Change: Sinn Féin gain from Independent Nationalist, Independent Nationalist becomes Independent

Newry Town

1997: 2 x Sinn Féin, 2 x SDLP, 1 x UUP, 1 x Independent, 1 x Independent Nationalist
2001: 3 x Sinn Féin, 3 x SDLP, 1 x Independent
1997-2001 Change: Sinn Féin and SDLP gain from UUP and Independent Nationalist

Slieve Gullion

1997: 3 x Sinn Féin, 2 x SDLP
2001: 4 x Sinn Féin, 1 x SDLP
1997-2001 Change: No change

The Fews

1997: 2 x Sinn Féin, 2 x UUP, 2 x SDLP
2001: 3 x Sinn Féin, 2 x UUP, 1 x SDLP
1997-2001 Change: Sinn Féin gain from SDLP

The Mournes

1997: 2 x UUP, 2 x SDLP, 1 x DUP
2001: 2 x UUP, 1 x SDLP, 1 x DUP, 1 x Sinn Féin
1997-2001 Change: No change

References

Newry and Mourne District Council elections
Newry and Mourne